The Nigeria Professional Football League (NPFL) is the highest level of the Nigerian football league system, for the Nigerian club-football championships. 
The Nigerian league has suffered, like many others, from the financial impact and dwindling fortunes since the late 2000s. 

 It is fed into by the Nigeria National League (NNL). It is organised by the League Management Company (LMC).

Name
It was formerly known as the Nigerian Premier League for the second time, as of the 2012/2013 Season from the 2003/2004 Season; "Nigerian Premiership" (2000–2003); "Nigerian Premier League", first time (1993–2000); "Nigerian Professional League" (1990–1993); Nigerian National League - First Division (1979–1990) and "the (Nigerian) National League" or "Nigerian Football League" (1972–1979),

International partnerships
On 27 April 2016, The Liga Nacional de Fútbol Profesional organisers of the La Liga sealed a five-year memorandum of understanding deal with the NPFL on capacity building and idea exchange signed by the League Management Company chairman, Shehu Dikko and the La Liga President Javier Tebas. The NPFL and La Liga partnership has already started bearing fruit as during the January transfer window, Super Eagles fringe player Ezekiel Bassey was signed on loan from Enyimba to Barcelona B on a six-month deal with an option of 3-years come end of the season based on performance. The NPFL AllStars (made up of the league's best players) have also been playing Pre-Season as well as Winter break friendlies with top flight Spanish sides like Atlético Madrid, Málaga, Valencia, Villareal etc. In an effort to expose and test Local players against top players and sides.

In Thursday, 25 May 2017, The Nigerian Football Federation (NFF)
alongside the League Management Company (LMC), also consummated a multi-faceted strategic agreement in
general football development with the Football Federation and Premier League body of the Kingdom of Morocco, NFF President Amaju Pinnick and NFF 2nd Vice-president/
LMC Chairman Shehu Dikko put pen to paper on a memorandum of understanding with their Moroccan counterparts, the result of detailed discussions, deliberations and considerations over time. The two FA Presidents signed their own sides in the
Office of the Federation Royale Marocaine de Football in Rabat, while the LMC 's Chairman, Shehu Dikko and Chairman of the Ligue Nationale de Football Professionnel (which organises the Botola), Said Naciri signed at the LNFP office, watched by the two FA bosses.

Eunisell, BET9JA and Hero lager  are current sponsors of the NPFL.

History

2017 season
Plateau United F.C. won the league on 9 September 2017, with a 2–0 victory over Enugu Rangers.

2018 season
In July 2018 the league was postponed indefinitely following crisis in the Nigerian Football Federation (NFF). Lobi Stars was declared as the sole representative of the league in the 2019 CAF Champions League as the team was at the top of the standings.

2019 season
The league consisted of 24 teams. Four were promoted from the Nigeria National League. Twenty teams remained from the previous season which was not completed. They were divided into two groups of 12 teams. The top three teams in each group contested for the title in the NPFL Super six championship playoff in Lagos. The People's Elephant finished at the top of the log with 12 points from five games.

Enyimba vs Kano Pillars is considered the biggest match of the season because of their rivalry and they remain the 2 teams yet to finish outside the top eight for 12 seasons.

Management 
The League Management Company (shortly and commonly known as the 'LMC') is the legal association football League governing body of the Nigeria Professional Football League. It was created and incorporated by the Nigeria Football Federation in 2012 to take over the nearly-collapsed Nigeria Football League (NFL), the former league governing body.

History
The NFF created the Nigeria Premier League, organized by the Nigeria Football League in 1990 as a step in attaining full professionalism as the sole regulatory for football in Nigeria. At the Onikan Stadium on 12 May 1990, the league was given a name as it was then known as the 'Professional League'.

However, in November 2012 with the agreement and support of the National Sports Commission, Nigeria's sports regulatory authority, the NFF constituted an Interim Management Committee (IMC) for the League as part of measures to avert a total collapse of the top tier professional League following the downfall of the Nigeria Football League (NFL) which arose from difficult legal and administrative impediments. The IMC supervised the formation and incorporation of the LMC to run a transparent and commercially viable professional league.

Achievements 
The first step the LMC took was to rebrand the League name, from the Nigerian Premier League to the Nigerian Professional Football League, (NPFL) or simply the Professional 'Football' League) Also, the LMC signed a $34m TV rights deal to broadcast league matches which lasted until 2017

In 2015, the League Management Company solicited financial support from the Government in order to upgrade existing grounds, provision of required broadcast and medical equipment and facilities in the stadiums.

The League Management Company has its framework and rules governing the 20 clubs in the Nigeria Professional Football League each season. On 5 July 2016, the NPFL adopted the TMS Domestic Transfer Matching System (DTMS), becoming the first league in Africa to do so.

The League Management Company is currently headed by Shehu Dikko.

Awards
In 2012, the NPFL was ranked as the best in Africa and 24th best in the world by the IFFHS, the rating puts it a spot above the Scottish Premier League for the year.

Qualification for African competitions

Association ranking for 2020–21 CAF competitions
Association ranking for 2020–21 CAF Champions League and 2020–21 CAF Confederation Cup will be based on results from each CAF tournament (Champions League and Confederation Cup) from 2016 to 2019–20.

Legend
 CL: CAF Champions League
 CC: CAF Confederation Cup

Past champions

Champions by season

1972: Mighty Jets (Jos)
1973: Bendel Insurance (Benin City)
1974: Rangers International (Enugu)
1975: Rangers International (Enugu)
1976: IICC Shooting Stars (Ibadan)
1977: Rangers International (Enugu)
1978: Racca Rovers (Kano)
1979: Bendel Insurance (Benin City)
1980: IICC Shooting Stars (Ibadan)
1981: Rangers International (Enugu)
1982: Rangers International (Enugu)
1983: IICC Shooting Stars (Ibadan)
1984: Rangers International (Enugu)
1985: New Nigeria Bank (Benin City)
1986: Leventis United (Ibadan)
1987: Iwuanyanwu Nationale (Owerri)
1988: Iwuanyanwu Nationale (Owerri)
1989: Iwuanyanwu Nationale (Owerri)
1990: Iwuanyanwu Nationale (Owerri)
1991: Julius Berger (Lagos)
1992: Stationery Stores (Lagos)
1993: Iwuanyanwu Nationale (Owerri)
1994: BCC Lions (Gboko)
1995: 3SC Shooting Stars (Ibadan)
1996: Udoji United (Awka)
1997: Eagle Cement (Port Harcourt)
1998: 3SC Shooting Stars (Ibadan)
1999: Lobi Stars (Makurdi)
2000: Julius Berger (Lagos)
2001: Enyimba (Aba)
2002: Enyimba (Aba)
2003: Enyimba (Aba)
2004: Dolphin (Port Harcourt)
2005: Enyimba (Aba)
2006: Ocean Boys (Brass)
2007: Enyimba (Aba)
2008: Kano Pillars (Kano)
2009: Bayelsa United (Yenegoa)
2010: Enyimba (Aba)
2011: Dolphin (Port Harcourt)
2012: Kano Pillars (Kano)
2013: Kano Pillars (Kano)
2014: Kano Pillars (Kano)
2015: Enyimba (Aba)
2016: Rangers International (Enugu)
2017: Plateau United (Jos)
2018: League deemed concluded after 24 match days
2019: Enyimba (Aba)
2019–20: League cancelled after 25 match days
2020–21: Akwa United (Uyo)
2021–22: Rivers United (Port Harcourt)

Most titles won

Top scorers

References

External links 
RSSSF competition history

 
1
Nigeria Football Federation
Top level football leagues in Africa